Happy Monster Band (also known as Happy Monster Band: Direct from Monsterland and Happy Monster Band: World Tour) is a short-lived animated children's television series that originally aired on Playhouse Disney from October 1, 2007, to October 28, 2008. The series was created by Don Carter and produced by Kickstart Productions. It is about a group of monsters who perform songs about friendship, love, exercise, chores, and other preschool themes.

Characters

Main
There are four monsters that make up the Happy Monster Band: Ink, Bluz, L.O., and Frred. Each of the monster's name reflects its color: Ink's signature color is pink, Bluz's is blue, L.O.'s is yellow and Frred's is red. They were designed by Don Carter. All four of the band members are children, but their singing voices are those of the members of the band Tally Hall. In the UK version, children's voices are used for the singing portions.

Frred (voiced by Rob Cantor (singing voice) and Kurt Doss (speaking voice)) is one of the band's lead singers and plays a purple electric guitar. While Ink may appear to be the leader, many fans tend to regard Frred as the actual leader.
L.O. (voiced by Zubin Sedghi (singing voice) and Trevor Gagnon (speaking voice)) is the other lead singer. L.O. is yellow and plays a green bass guitar with four strings. He is the only monster in the band that goes against traditional thinking, preferring to paint and write poetry instead of scaring. He is considered to be a shy introvert. He is the oldest member in the band.
Bluz (voiced by Joe Hawley (singing voice), Jonah Lees (Direct from Monsterland), and Jake T. Austin (World tour) (speaking voices)) is the band's keyboardist, is blue and has four legs. His keyboard is magenta and has twelve black keys. Bluz often contradicts L.O.'s opinions, stating that monsters should scare and not care about art. During the World Tour, Bluz knows a little bit about foreign languages, which makes him appear unintelligent. However, he shows kindness and empathy for others. He can also be very friendly. He is the youngest member of the band.
Ink (voiced by Hannah Leigh (speaking voice) and Tara Sands (singing voice)) is the band's drummer. She has three eyes and is pink. Her drums can glow either pink, magenta or purple. Unlike the other band members, Ink only sings during choruses. However she has a solo verse in "Do the Monster Stomp". During the World Tour, she carries a globe that shows where the band is and is fluent in several languages.

Supporting
The first season introduces several characters.

Roc and Raoul (voiced by Yuri Lowenthal and Sam Riegel, respectively) are two-headed purple monster brothers and are the show's hosts. They speak in rhyme, except while backstage, and are also present in season two (World Tour).
La, Dee, and Da are the show's judges and are only in the first season. They are all bright green and are based on Randy Jackson, Paula Abdul, and Simon Cowell.

World Tour
Akito is the band's pen pal in Tokyo, Japan. He has a robot named Robo-Dude.
Joey is a kangaroo in Sydney, Australia.
Dwight is a giant monster in Italy who is often hungry and is used as a comedic explanation for the Tower of Pisa's leaning and for the Colosseum missing a large part of its wall.
Ravi is an energetic four-year-old boy in India. He has the biggest star in Bollywood, Pooja.
The Rancher is an introducer in Texas.
Johnny and Franklin were introduced in the World Tour episode "The Monster Tangle" in Argentina.
The Queen is a three-eyed monster who lives in Buckingham Palace.
The Gondolier is a monster who rows a gondola in Venice, Italy.
The Beret Monster is a monster with a beret in France. Bluz talks to him about his beret but he doesn't know where he got it from which made Bluz upset, then he gave the beret to Bluz and Bluz got really happy and puts it on.

Episodes

Series One (Direct from Monsterland, 2007)
 "I Will Be Your Friend"(L.O.'s memory book)– the monsters celebrate their long friendship together.
 "Do the Monster Stomp"(the missing dance move)– Frred thinks that Bluz found what was missing.
 "Monster Hoe Down"(a monster scare dance)– the monsters dress up as cowboys and cowgirl.
 "Dirty, Smelly Monster Chores"(waiting for L.O.)– L.O. does chores, spreading clothes on the floor, bringing in garbage and tracking mud around.
 "Scare Up Some Fun"(band: gone missing)– the twins see an empty room and think that the band is not there. The band tries to scare them.
 "I'm the Best at Being Me"(L.O. the best)– L.O. is not as scary as Bluz because he likes to write poetry and paint.
 "Do Re Mi–Mi–Mi"(ink's rhyme struggle)– Ink struggles to write a song for work.
 "Even Monsters Cry Sometimes"(touch me circle)– Frred is sad because his father has a flat tire and he worries he will miss the concert, making him cry until his friends comfort him, saying it’s okay for anyone, even monsters, to cry.
 "Get Up and Go Go Go"(morning routines ON!)– the band tell the twins to get ready.
 "Practice Makes Progress"(get ready to practice)– Ink's jump rope contest is coming up, so she practices her skills.

Series Two (World Tour, 2008)
 "Here in Australia"-The band rocks at the Sydney Opera House in Australia.
 "A Wonderful Time in France"-While The band is in France, Bluz wanted to ask The Beret Monster where did he got his beret from.
 "Yin & Yang"-The band is in Hong Kong.
 "London Town"-The band finds a double decker bus in England because their bus has a flat tire.
 "In India"-The band makes a Bollywood movie at the Taj Mahal and rocks with a tiger, a snake charmer and Pooja the elephant in India.
 "Siesta! Siesta!"-The band plays soccer in Spain.
 "The Monster Tangle"-The band does the Monster Tangle instead of a tango in Argentina.
 "Konichiwa!"-The band rocks in Tokyo.
 "At the Rodeo"-The band is in Texas and is at the ranch. Frred is on a horse and twirls a lasso. Frred is a rock-and-roll rodeo cowboy.
 "The Italian Way"-The band is in Venice and Frred is very hungry but L.O. accidentally drops his camera.

Production
The music was written and performed by indie rock band Tally Hall. The characters and concept for the show were created by children's book author and illustrator, Don Carter. Judy Rothman Rofé wrote all the episodes in Season One and five of the episodes in Season Two.

Broadcast 
In the United Kingdom, the show was shown on Playhouse Disney/Disney Junior from October 5, 2007, to 2014.

References

External links

2007 American television series debuts
2008 American television series endings
2000s American animated television series
2007 British television series debuts
2008 British television series endings
2000s British animated television series
American children's animated musical television series
American flash animated television series
American preschool education television series
British children's animated musical television series
British flash animated television series
British preschool education television series
Animated preschool education television series
2000s preschool education television series
Disney Channel original programming
Television series by Disney
Disney Junior original programming
English-language television shows
Animated television series about children
Animated television series about monsters